The Who concert disaster was a crowd disaster that occurred on December 3, 1979, when English rock band The Who performed at Riverfront Coliseum (now known as Heritage Bank Center) in Cincinnati, Ohio, United States, and a rush of concert-goers outside the Coliseum's entry doors resulted in the deaths of 11 people.

Background
The Who was in the midst of the United States leg of its 1979 world tour, which began in September with a total of seven dates split between the Capitol Theatre in Passaic, New Jersey and Madison Square Garden in New York City. The tour was its first following the 1978 death of drummer Keith Moon and its first to feature former Small Faces drummer Kenney Jones as Moon's official replacement. The band then took some time off, and resumed the tour on November 30 at the auditorium of the Detroit Masonic Temple. The Cincinnati concert was the third show played in this portion of the tour, after a concert the night before at the Pittsburgh Civic Arena.

The concert was a sellout, with 18,348 tickets sold.

Summary of events

People were originally told through a radio station that General Admission ticket holders would be admitted at 3:00 p.m. and therefore a sizable crowd formed by 5:00 p.m. Although all the doors were expected to be opened simultaneously, only a pair of doors at the far right of the main entrance were finally opened. As concert goers entered the stadium through these two open doors, those waiting in front of all of the other doors began pushing forward again.

After a short period of waiting and then knocking on the doors and the glass next to the doors, the crowd assumed that none of the remaining doors would be opened. At about 7:15 p.m., the situation began to escalate. Conflicting reports suggested that concertgoers could hear either a very late soundcheck or The Who's Quadrophenia movie, in lieu of an opening act. Either way, the crowd assumed that The Who were on earlier than scheduled.

At that point, the entire crowd surged and pushed toward the two doors which had been opened. This caused many people to get trampled while some suffered more serious injuries. Eleven people were unable to escape the dense crowd pushing toward them and died by asphyxiation. Twenty-six other people reported injuries.

Fire officials advised Who manager Bill Curbishley to cancel the concert, but he convinced them to allow the show to continue to avoid further panic. The concert went on as planned, with the band members not told of the tragedy until after their performance. Years later, Who guitarist Pete Townshend recalled his feelings after the show; "I went through two phases. One was, of course, tremendous upset and concern. But the other was incredible anger that we had been performing while this was going on."

The following night, a lengthy segment on the tragedy aired on the CBS Evening News with Walter Cronkite examining violence at rock concerts. At The Who's next concert in Buffalo on December 4, lead singer Roger Daltrey told the crowd: "We lost a lot of family last night. This show's for them." Years later, Townshend said he regretted leaving Cincinnati and continuing to tour, remarking on the Buffalo concert "We’re in the wrong city. We’re in Buffalo."

The eleven people who died in the crush were:

 Walter Adams, Jr., aged 22, Trotwood, Ohio
 Peter Bowes, aged 18, Wyoming, Ohio
 Connie Sue Burns, aged 21, Miamisburg, Ohio
 Jacqueline Eckerle, aged 15, Finneytown, Ohio
 David Heck, aged 19, Highland Heights, Kentucky
 Teva Rae Inlow Ladd, aged 27, Newtown, Ohio
 Karen Morrison, aged 15, Finneytown, Ohio
 Stephan Preston, aged 19, Finneytown, Ohio
 Philip Snyder, aged 20, Franklin, Ohio
 Bryan Wagner, aged 17, Fort Thomas, Kentucky
 James Theodore Warmoth, aged 21, Franklin, Ohio

Aftermath

In Providence, Rhode Island, Mayor Vincent A. Cianci cancelled a scheduled performance of The Who at the city's Civic Center that same month. This was despite the fact that the Providence venue had assigned seating. In 2012, the band returned to Providence and honored tickets from the 1979 show.

The families of the victims sued the band, concert promoter Electric Factory Concerts, and the city of Cincinnati. The class action suit filed on behalf of ten of the families was settled in 1983, awarding each of the families of the deceased approximately $150,000 ($ today). The family of Peter Bowes opted out of the class action and settled later for an undisclosed amount.  Approximately $750,000 ($ today) was to be divided among the 26 injured. The city of Cincinnati also imposed a ban on unassigned festival seating on December 27, 1979, with minor exceptions, for the next 25 years.

The incident was the subject of a book, Are the Kids All Right? The Rock Generation and Its Hidden Death Wish, as well as a second-season episode of WKRP in Cincinnati called "In Concert". It also inspired scenes in the film Pink Floyd – The Wall, whose 1982 premiere was attended by The Who's Pete Townshend.

In 2004, the city of Cincinnati permanently repealed its long-standing ban on unassigned seating, two years after temporarily making an exception for a Bruce Springsteen concert. The goal of lifting the ban was to attract more big-name acts. However, the city now mandates there must be nine square feet per person at a venue, and the number of tickets sold for each event is adjusted accordingly.

Paul Wertheimer, the city's first Public Information Officer at the time of the tragedy, went on to serve on a task force on crowd control, and later founded Crowd Management Strategies in 1992, a consulting firm based in Los Angeles.

In 2009, thirty years after the tragedy, rock station WEBN/102.7 aired a retrospective on the event, including clips from news coverage in 1979.

The P.E.M. Memorial was created in August 2010 to commemorate the lives of those who were tragically lost while awaiting entry to the concert. Every first Saturday in December, local musicians perform at the P.E.M. Memorial. The free concert features old and new tunes to raise awareness of the P.E.M. Scholarship Fund. Of the 11 people who died that day, three were from Finneytown High School – Stephan Preston, Jackie Eckerle and Karen Morrison. Three scholarships are awarded annually to eligible Finneytown High School seniors who are pursuing higher education in the arts or music at an accredited university or college. In 2018, Roger Daltrey visited the Finneytown High School and met with a group of family members of victims and survivors. Daltrey and the families later said the meeting brought a great deal of peace and healing.

In 2014, Pearl Jam played in the city and acknowledged the tragedy. They dedicated a cover of The Who's "The Real Me" to those who died. Pearl Jam had experienced a similar tragedy in 2000, when nine people died in a crush during their concert at Roskilde Festival.

On the eve of the 35th anniversary of the tragedy, Cincinnati Mayor John Cranley promised to have a historical marker on the site of the tragedy in 2015. A committee consisting of three concert survivors (Mike Babb, Thomas Brown, Rick Schwitzer) and one family member of victim Teva Ladd (Kasey Ladd)  were pivotal in getting the memorial placed. The marker was dedicated at U. S. Bank Arena (as it was then known) on December 3, 2015.

The Showtime series Roadies dedicated an entire episode to the 1979 event. The episode, "The City Whose Name Must Not Be Spoken", showcases the "roadies" of a fictional band completing many rituals after someone on the tour bus mentions Cincinnati.

The event was covered on the podcast My Favorite Murder by Karen Kilgariff in episode 166, released on May 28, 2019.

The Who's return to Cincinnati

On the 40th anniversary of the tragedy in December 2019, Cincinnati television station WCPO aired the documentary The Who: The Night That Changed Rock about the incident and its aftermath, which featured interviews from survivors, family members, Daltrey, and Townshend. The documentary and a separate WCPO news broadcast marked the first time that Daltrey and Townshend had ever conducted interviews solely about the Cincinnati disaster.

In 2019, The Who announced plans for a Cincinnati-area performance in April 2020, to be held at the BB&T Arena at Northern Kentucky University, although the concert was postponed because of the COVID-19 pandemic. Pete Townshend said in a documentary which aired on the anniversary of the tragedy, "We need to go back to Cincinnati, you know, we do. As soon as we can. It would be such a joyous occasion for us, and such a healing thing." Townshend also said that he regretted that the band did not stay around to mourn with others at the venue on the night of the tragedy, saying "I'm not forgiving us. We should have stayed."

After 43 years, The Who returned to perform in Cincinnati on May 15, 2022, as a part of their North American "The Who Hits Back" tour, with the event moved from BB&T Arena to TQL Stadium. It was the first time the band had played in Cincinnati since the incident in 1979. Students from Finneytown High School were booked to play and sing alongside the band for a portion of the concert. The concert's opening act was Safe Passage, a local band featuring members of the Finneytown High School Class of 1979, and two of its members had attended the Riverfront Coliseum concert. The families of nine of the victims of the disaster were in attendance. Prior to the band taking the stage, a video message from Pearl Jam singer Eddie Vedder was broadcast in which he recalled how Daltrey and Townshend had comforted him after a fatal crowd crush occurred during his band's 2000 set at the Roskilde Festival in Denmark.

During their performance, The Who incorporated several tributes to Cincinnati and the victims at the 1979 concert. The names and photos of the 11 victims were displayed throughout the concert. Photographs of the 11 victims of the 1979 disaster appeared on the venue's video screens as Who keyboardist Loren Gold performed an 11-minute instrumental introduction to "Love Reign O'er Me". The band was accompanied by 10 current Finneytown High students during the concert-ending performance of "Baba O'Riley".

See also
 Crowd collapses and crushes
 List of fatal crowd crushes

References

External links

 WEBN's 2009 retrospective of the event
 Raw footage of the event

1979 disasters in the United States
1979 in music
1979 in Ohio
20th century in Cincinnati
Disasters in Ohio
Human stampedes in the United States
Man-made disasters in the United States
Stadium disasters
The Who concert tours
Concert disasters